The Prelude in G-Flat Major, Op. 23 No. 10 is a 1903 composition by Sergei Rachmaninoff. It is part of Rachmaninoff's Ten Preludes, Op. 23.

Structure 

It is written in conventional ternary form. The main theme in the left hand is accompanied by syncopated chords in the right hand; it begins at measure 2 and ends at measure 6. A parallel period follows from measures 6–11, ending on an imperfect cadence. In measures 11–18, a sequential period that is based on the rhythm of the main theme follows. Soprano and bass track each other in this section:

Measures 11 and 12

The "B" section, from measures 18–34, employs sequential fragments of the "A" section. Syncopated chords from the "A" section are elongated. Rising chromatic patterns are present in both the bass and treble. Consider measures 18–20 and 23–25:

Measures 18–20

Measures 23–25

Measures 35 and 36

Measures 49 and 50

Measures 15 and 16

Recordings

References

External links 
 Detailed analysis of G-flat Major prelude in 5 layers (by Lance Bastian)

Preludes by Sergei Rachmaninoff
Compositions in G-flat major